Comitas albicincta is a species of sea snail, a marine gastropod mollusc in the family Pseudomelatomidae, the turrids and allies.

Description
G.W. Tryon was of the opinion that this was a more highly colored adult of Drillia putillus (synonym of Clavus putillus (Reeve, 1845)) with the peripheral row of tubercles whitish. He couldn't find other differences. 

The fusiform shell consists of ten whorls. These are transversally crossed by delicate striae. The fulvescent shell shows a white zone that passes over the nodules upon the angle in the center of each whorl. The sinus is small.

Distribution
This marine species occurs in the East China Sea and in the South China Sea

References

 Adams A & Reeve L. Mollusca. Part 2. In: Adams A, editor. The zoology of the voyage of the H. M. S. Samarang; under the command of Captain Sir Edward Belcher, C. B., F. R. A. S., F. G. S., during the years 1843–1846. London: Reeve & Benham; 1850. pp. 25–41. pls 10–17
 Powell, Arthur William Baden. "The family Turridae in the Indo-Pacific. Part 2. The subfamily Turriculinae." Indo-Pacific Mollusca 2.10 (1969): 207-416.

External links
 

albicincta
Gastropods described in 1850